Methanococcoides methylutens is a methylotrophic marine methanogen, the type species of its genus. It utilises trimethylamine, diethylamine, monomethylamine, and methanol as substrates for growth and methanogenesis. Cells are non-motile, non-spore-forming, irregular cocci 1 μm in diameter which stain Gram-negative and occur singly or in pairs. TMA-10 is the type strain (ATCC 33938).

Genome

The genome has 15 contigs, 2,508,511 base pairs, and GC content of approximately 42.5%.

References

Further reading

External links
LPSN
 
WORMS
Type strain of Methanococcoides methylutens at BacDive -  the Bacterial Diversity Metadatabase

Euryarchaeota
Archaea described in 1985